Guaranty Building is a high-rise Beaux Arts office building located at 6331 Hollywood Boulevard in Hollywood, Los Angeles, California. It was built in 1923 and was designed by John C. Austin. It was added to the National Register of Historic Places on September 4, 1979. The building is currently owned by the Church of Scientology.

History 
According to the file on the building published by the National Register of Historic Places, the reasoning for giving the building a landmark status is as follows: “The Guaranty Building has played a major role in the commercial development of this area. As a key financial institution, the Guaranty Building is a fine example of the use of a neo-classical architectural expression to project the desired "conservative" image. The northeast corner of Ivar Street and Hollywood Boulevard has always occupied a special place in the social and economic history of Hollywood. Part of the original Hollywood ranch owned by Horace and Daeida Wilcox, the corner became the first permanent site of the First Methodist Church of Hollywood in 1910. The Guaranty Building and Loan Association paid the church $2000 per front foot for the site in 1923, and proceeded to erect the twelve story Guaranty Building, one of the first height-limit (150 feet) buildings on Hollywood Blvd.”

References

Commercial buildings on the National Register of Historic Places in Los Angeles
Office buildings completed in 1923
Skyscraper office buildings in Los Angeles
Buildings and structures in Hollywood, Los Angeles
Scientology properties